France 3 Picardie is one France 3's regional services, broadcasting to people in the Picardy region. France 3 Picardie is headquartered in Amiens. France 3 Picardie produces news programs and other content. The channel was founded in 1950 as RTF Télé-Lille.

References

External links 
 Official Site 

1950 establishments in France
03 Picardie
Television channels and stations established in 1950
Mass media in Amiens